Annalena is a feminine given name. Notable people with the name include:

 Annalena Baerbock (born 1980), German politician 
 Annalena McAfee (born c. 1952), British children's author and journalist
 Annalena Tonelli (1943–2003), Italian lawyer and social activist

See also
 Anna-Lena, given name
 Analena, Croatian-Slovenian post-hardcore band

Feminine given names